Speedknot Mobstaz are a hip hop group affiliated with Twista. They have released albums Mobstability, and Mobstability II: Nation Business. In 1994, they made their debut appearance on Twista's 2nd album, Resurrection.

Discography

External links 
[ Mobstability > Overview] at Allmusic
[ Mobstability II > Nations Bizness > Overview] at Allmusic
"Speedknot Mobstaz - Life In The Fast Lane" interview at Sixshot.com

American hip hop groups
Musical groups from Chicago
Musical groups established in 1998
Midwest hip hop groups
American musical duos
Hip hop duos
Gangsta rap groups